Latnik was an  monitor built for the Imperial Russian Navy in the mid-1860s. The design was based on the American , but was modified to suit Russian engines, guns and construction techniques. She was one of two ships of the class to be built in Belgium and assembled in Russia. Spending her entire career with the Baltic Fleet, the ship was only active when the Gulf of Finland was not frozen, but very little is known about her service. She was stricken in 1900 from the Navy List, converted into a coal barge in 1903 and renamed Barzha No. 38 and then Barzha No. 326. Abandoned by the Soviets in Finland in 1918, the ship was later scrapped by the Finns.

Description
She displaced , and her crew numbered eight officers and 88 enlisted men in 1865. They numbered 10 officers and 100 crewmen in 1877.

The ship was fitted with a two-cylinder, horizontal direct-acting steam engine built by Carr and MacPherson of Saint Petersburg. It drove a single propeller using steam that was provided by two rectangular boilers.

Latnik was designed to be armed with a pair of  smoothbore muzzle-loading guns purchased from Krupp of Germany and rifled in Russia, but the rifling project was seriously delayed and the ship was completed with nine-inch smoothbores. These lacked the penetration power necessary to deal with ironclads and they were replaced by license-built  smoothbore muzzle-loading Rodman guns in 1867–68. The Rodman guns were replaced around 1876 with the originally intended nine-inch rifled guns.

All of the wrought-iron armor that was used in the Uragan-class monitors was in  plates, just as in the Passaic-class ships. The gun turret was protected by eleven layers of armor and the pilothouse above it had eight layers of armor. Unlike their predecessors, the Uragans were built without deck armor to save weight, but Latniks deck was reinforced by the addition of  armor plates after completion.

Career
Construction of the ship began on 17 June 1863 at the Carr and MacPherson Shipyard in Saint Petersburg. Latnik was laid down on 24 December 1863 and she was launched on 22 March 1864. She entered service on 14 July 1865 and cost a total of 1,148,000 rubles, almost double her contract cost of 600,000 rubles. The ship was assigned to the Baltic Fleet upon completion. For some reason, she was the only ship of the class not to make a port visit to Stockholm, Sweden in July–August 1865. She suffered some sort of hull damage in September, but the details are not known.

Later, an armored, outward-curving bulwark was fitted around the top of the turret to protect any crewmen there. Three sponsons were later added, probably during the 1870s, to the upper portion of the turret. Each sponson, one above the gun ports and one on each side of the turret, mounted a light gun, probably a  Engstrem gun, for defense against torpedo boats. A fourth gun was mounted on a platform aft of the funnel when a hurricane deck was built between the funnel and the turret, also probably during the 1870s.

Little is known about the ship's career other than that she was laid up each winter when the Gulf of Finland froze. Latnik was reclassified as a coast defense ironclad on 13 February 1892 and turned over to the Port of Kronstadt for disposal on 6 July 1900, although she was not stricken until 17 August. During 1903, the ship was converted into a coal barge by the removal of her turret, her side armor, and its wooden backing, and by the division of her hull into three holds. She was redesignated as Barzha No. 38 and, in 1914, Barzha No. 326. She was abandoned by the Russians in Helsingfors (Helsinki) when they were forced to withdraw from Finland in April 1918 according to the terms of the Treaty of Brest-Litovsk and was later broken up there.

Notes

Footnotes

References

Uragan-class monitors
1864 ships
Ships built at the Baltic Shipyard